Drepanoidea is the superfamily of "hook tip moths".  See Minet and Scoble (1999) for a comprehensive overview.

References
Minet, J. and Scoble, M.J. (1999). The Drepanoid/Geometroid Assemblage. Ch. 17 in Kristensen, N.P. (Ed.). Lepidoptera, Moths and Butterflies. Volume 1: Evolution, Systematics, and Biogeography. Handbuch der Zoologie. Eine Naturgeschichte der Stämme des Tierreiches / Handbook of Zoology. A Natural History of the phyla of the Animal Kingdom. Band / Volume IV Arthropoda: Insecta Teilband / Part 35: 491 pp. Walter de Gruyter, Berlin, New York.

Sources
Firefly Encyclopedia of Insects and Spiders, edited by Christopher O'Toole, 2002

 
Lepidoptera superfamilies
Macroheterocera